A forum (Latin forum  "public place outdoors", plural fora; English plural either fora or forums) was a public square in a Roman municipium, or any civitas,  reserved primarily for the vending of goods; i.e., a marketplace, along with the buildings used for shops and the stoas used for open stalls. Many fora were constructed at remote locations along a road by the magistrate responsible for the road, in which case the forum was the only settlement at the site and had its own name, such as Forum Popili or Forum Livi.

The functions of a forum

In addition to its standard function as a marketplace, a forum was a gathering place of great social significance, and often the scene of diverse activities, including political discussions and debates, rendezvous, meetings, et cetera. In that case, it supplemented the function of a conciliabulum.

Every municipium had a forum. Fora were the first of any civitas synoecized whether Latin, Italic, Etruscan, Greek, Celtic or some other. The first forums were sited between independent villages in the period, known only through archaeology. After the rise of the Roman Republic, the most noted forum of the Roman world, the Roman Forum in Rome itself, served as a model of new construction. By the time of the late Republic expansions refurbishing of the forums of the city had inspired Pompey Magnus to create the Theatre of Pompey in 55 BC. The Theatre included a massive forum behind the theatre arcades known as the Porticus Pompei (Colonnades of Pompey). The structure was the forebearer to Julius Caesar's first Imperial forum and the rest to follow.

Other major fora are found in Italy; however, they are not to be confused with the piazza of the modern town, which may have originated from a number of different types of ancient civic centers, or more likely was its own type. While similar in use and function to fora, most were created in the Middle Ages and are often not a part of the original city footprint.

Fora were a regular part of every Roman province in the Republic and the Empire, with archaeological examples at:
 Forum of Plovdiv, Bulgaria
 Forum of Philippi, Greece
 Forum of Thessaloniki, Greece
 Forum of Beirut, Lebanon 
 Forum and Provincial Forum of Mérida, Spain
 Colonial forum and Provincial forum of Tarragona, Spain

In new Roman towns the forum was usually located at, or just off, the intersection of the main north–south and east–west streets (the cardo and decumanus). All fora would have a Temple of Jupiter at the north end, and would also contain other temples, as well as the Basilica; a public weights and measures table, so customers at the market could ensure they were not being sold short measures; and would often have the baths nearby. At election times, candidates would use the steps of the temples in the forum to make their election speeches, and would expect their clients to come to support them.

Typical forum structures
 Basilica
 Roman baths
 Roman temple
 Triumphal arch
 Victory column

Equivalent spaces in other cultures
 Agora
 Civic center
 Internet forum
 Piazza
 Plateia
 Plaza
 Town square

See also

 Amphitheatre
 Circus (building)
 Hippodrome
 Roman theatre (structure)
 A Funny Thing Happened on the Way to the Forum

References

External links

 
Urban studies and planning terminology
Ancient Roman city planning